Wish You Were Here is a 1987 British comedy-drama film written and directed by David Leland and starring Emily Lloyd, Tom Bell, Geoffrey Hutchings, and Jesse Birdsall. The film follows a girl's coming-of-age in a small coastal town in postwar England. It is loosely based on the formative years of British madam Cynthia Payne. The original music score was composed by Stanley Myers.

The film received acclaim from critics, winning the International Federation of Film Critics prize at the 1987 Cannes Film Festival, a BAFTA award for Best Screenplay for director Leland, and the Best Actress Award for Lloyd from the National Society of Film Critics.

Plot
In the early 1950s, sixteen-year-old Lynda Mansell lives in a small English seaside town with her widowed father Hubert and younger sister, Margaret. Feisty, outspoken, and precocious, Lynda likes to shock other people with her histrionic behavior (such as bicycling at the boardwalk with her skirt hiked up, inviting young men to compare her legs to Betty Grable's) and vulgar speech (her favorite insult is "Up yer bum"). Lynda works at a variety of places, including a bus garage and a fish and chip shop, but her rebellious nature often ends in her losing the job. Hubert, whom Lynda has an adversarial relationship with, unsuccessfully tries to correct Lynda's behavior by taking her to a psychiatrist. Flashbacks reveal Lynda was close with her late mother.

Lynda returns the affections of a couple of male suitors, but the dates she goes on with them are unsatisfying. Eric, a bookie and one of Hubert's middle-aged friends, takes an interest in Lynda. Lynda initially refuses Eric's advances, but as her relationship with her father grows increasingly strained, Lynda begins sleeping with Eric. When Hubert finds out who she is with, he tells Lynda how ashamed he is of her, and how her mother would be as well if she were alive.

Lynda leaves her home to move in with Eric, but is greeted with his callous behavior instead of the affection and love she craves. She eventually leaves him and gets a job as a waitress at a tea room. Eric shows up and needles Lynda, insisting he has missed her. He only stops pestering her when she reveals she is pregnant. Lynda considers getting an illegal abortion, but realizes she does not have the money for one.

Having learned of his estranged daughter's pregnancy, Hubert shows up to the tea room and demands to talk to Lynda. Lynda denounces Hubert as he calls her a slut. The pair's argument escalates into a public spectacle with Lynda getting up on a table and shouting about British respectability and hypocrisy and insulting the customers. Though Lynda is fired, a few customers applaud her rants, including the elderly woman who plays the tea room piano.

Desperate and down-on-her-luck, Lynda meets with her Aunt Millie. Aunt Millie tries to persuade Lynda to get an abortion or to give the baby up for adoption, as women who have children out of wedlock are looked down upon in society. Aunt Millie tells Lynda the choice is ultimately hers, but leaves her some money to pay for an abortion. Lynda returns to the abortion provider but hesitates at the doorstep as she imagines her father and daughter as onlookers.

Several months later, Lynda returns home. She arrives at her destination—the bus garage she used to work at—with a newborn baby. She passes by all the places she formerly frequented, including the promenade where she would flash her legs at the boys. Onlookers, a visibly uncomfortable Eric amongst them, are stunned to see Lynda defiantly pushing her baby in a pram. The film ends with Lynda ringing the doorbell to Hubert's home and embracing her baby.

Cast

Production
Director David Leland loosely based the film on Cynthia Payne's adolescence growing up on the Sussex coast. Personal Services, a film about Payne's experiences as an adult woman, was also written by Leland and released prior to Wish You Were Here. Wish You Were Here was filmed in the Sussex towns of Brighton, Worthing, and Bognor Regis over a period of six weeks.

The first day of filming was on Emily Lloyd's 16th birthday.

Reception
Wish You Were Here has an overall approval rating of 85% on Rotten Tomatoes based on 33 reviews. Roger Ebert gave the film 3½ stars out of four, describing it as "a comedy with an angry undertone, a story of a free-spirited girl who holds a grudge against a time when such girls were a threat to society, to the interlocking forces of sexism and convention that conspired to break their spirits". Ebert praised Lloyd's performance as "one of the great debut roles for a young actress". Janet Maslin of The New York Times wrote, "Lynda's wild outbursts - toward the end of the film, she insults her lover and denounces her father in the genteel tea room where she works as a waitress - are as entertaining as they are cathartic, and Miss Lloyd delivers these strings of epithets as colorfully as Mr. Leland writes them. Miss Lloyd [manages] to seem both feisty and fragile...capturing the full emotional range of this complicated young girl".

Sheila Benson of the Los Angeles Times complimented the film's attention to period detail, as well as Leland's direction, citing "[he] has a reason, a purpose, a history for every character—and for every claustrophobic brick row-house or damp, echoing picture palace". She said the film manages to be funny and dark without becoming maudlin, becoming "something more than the words on a souvenir post card...a cry from the heart".

The film made £2,994,209 at the UK box office.

Awards and honors

See also
 Personal Services

References

External links
 
 
 
 

1987 films
1980s coming-of-age comedy-drama films
1987 independent films
1980s teen comedy-drama films
British coming-of-age comedy-drama films
British independent films
British teen comedy-drama films
Films about dysfunctional families
Films about widowhood
Films set in the 1950s
Films set in Sussex
Films set on beaches
Films whose writer won the Best Original Screenplay BAFTA Award
Juvenile sexuality in films
Teenage pregnancy in film
Films directed by David Leland
Films scored by Stanley Myers
1987 directorial debut films
Films about abortion
Films about adolescence
Films about father–daughter relationships
1980s English-language films
1980s British films